Kefee Obareki Don Momoh (February 5, 1980 – June 12, 2014), also referred to by her music name Kefee, was a Nigerian female gospel singer and composer.

Early life
She was born in Sapele, Delta on February 5, 1980 to the family of Andrew Obareki who were at a time Deacons at a church founded by the parents of her ex-husband Alec Godwin. Kefee graduated from University of Benin with a degree in Business Administration. Growing up as teen, she actively engaged herself with church activities especially singing in the choir.

Career
As her passion for music kept growing bigger, she started writing and composing songs. In 2000 she released an album titled "Trip" and that made way for her into the Nigerian music scene as a Gospel artist. In 2003, she got signed to Alec's Entertainment, a record label founded by her former choir director and she released her debut studio album Branama shortly after that. The Branama album brought her into the spot light as a fulfilled Gospel artist with sales both national and international. Branama sold nine thousand cassettes in three weeks and over two million CD/VCDs in a month. It served as a starting part to her successful career as Nigerian gospel artist. The late singer's best known hits are "Branama" and "Kokoroko".

Awards
She was awarded the International Young Ambassador for Peace Award in 2009.
Kefee won the 2010 Headies Awards for Best Collaboration with Timaya for "Kokoroko".

Private life 
Kefee was married twice. She was married to Alec Godwin for three years until 2008. She married radio host Teddy Esosa Don-Momoh on 3 March 2013 in Sapele, Delta state.

Death and burial
Though the cause of death was rumoured to be pre-eclampsia, Kefee Obareki Don Momoh died of lung failure at a hospital in Los Angeles, California on June 12, 2014. She had been in a coma for fifteen days.

She was buried on Friday July 11, 2014 in her hometown Okpara Inland, Ethiope East Local Government Area of Delta State, Nigeria.

Discography
Studio albums
Branama (2003)
Branama 2 (2005)
A Piece Of Me (2008)
A Chorus Leader (2012)
EPs
Dan Maliyo (2012)
 Posthumous albums
Beautiful (2015)

See also
 List of Nigerian gospel musicians

References

External links 
 

2014 deaths
1980 births
Nigerian gospel singers
Musicians from Delta State
Deaths from respiratory failure
University of Benin (Nigeria) alumni
Burials in Delta State